Peter George Demos (14 August 1925 – 21 January 2011) was an Australian basketball player. He competed in the men's tournament at the 1956 Summer Olympics.

References

1925 births
2011 deaths
Australian men's basketball players
Olympic basketball players of Australia
Basketball players at the 1956 Summer Olympics
Place of birth missing